Briceño (also anglicized as Briceno) may refer to:

Places
 Briceño, Antioquia, town and municipality in Antioquia Department, Colombia
 Briceño, Boyacá, town and municipality in Boyacá Department, Colombia

People
 Alonso de Briceño (1587–1668), Roman Catholic prelate, Bishop of Caracas 
 Antonio Briceño (born 1966), Venezuelan photographer and environmental activist
 Bárbara Briceño (born 1996), Peruvian volleyball player
 Carlos Briceno (born 1967), American volleyball player
 Daniel Briceño (disambiguation), multiple people, including:
Daniel Briceño (Colombian footballer) (born 1985), Colombian footballer
Daniel Briceño (Chilean footballer) (born 1982), Chilean footballer
 Elijio Briceño (1938–2016), Belizean politician
 Francisco Briceño (died 1571), Roman Catholic prelate, Bishop of Almería
 Germán Briceño (born 1919), Venezuelan sports shooter
 Humberto Briceño (born 1928), Venezuelan sports shooter
 Johnny Briceño (born 1960), Belizean politician
 José Gregorio Briceño (born 1965), Venezuelan politician
 Lorena Briceño (born 1978), Argentine judoka
 Luis de Briceño (fl. 1610s–1630s), Spanish guitarist and music theorist
 Maria Briceno, Venezuelan road cyclist
 Mario Briceño (born 1996), Chilean football winger
 Mario Briceño Iragorry (1897–1958), Venezuelan intellectual and cultural analyst
 Omar Briceño (born 1978), Mexican football defender
 Oscar Briceño (born 1985), Colombian football forward
 Rohel Briceño (born 1984), Venezuelan footballer
 Thomas Briceño (born 1993), Chilean judoka
 Ulices Briceño (born 1993), Mexican footballer
 Gustavo Rangel Briceño (born 1956), Venezuelan military officer and minister of defense
 Jorge Valero Briceño (born 1946), Venezuelan ambassador

See also

Briseño, the less popular variant

Surnames of Peruvian origin
Surnames of Colombian origin
Surnames of Venezuelan origin
Surnames of Argentine origin
Surnames of Mexican origin
Surnames of Chilean origin
Surnames of Belizean origin
Spanish-language surnames